The Rhythmic Gymnastics competition for the 2014 Pacific Rim Gymnastics Championships was held on 10 April to 12 April 2014 at the Richmond Olympic Oval. The juniors and seniors competed together in the team final and individual all-around, but competed separately during the apparatus finals. Only the juniors will compete in the group competition. The junior group competition as well as the ball and hoop portion of the team and all-around competition were held on 10 April. The ribbons and club portion of the team and all-around competition were held on 11 April, The apparatus finals were held on 12 April.

Team
Results

Senior

All-Around
Results

Hoop 
Results

Ball
Results

Clubs
Results

Ribbon
Results

Junior

All-Around
Results

Hoop 
Results

Ball
Results

Clubs
Results

Ribbon
Results

Group
Results

References

Pacific Rim Championships
Pacific Rim Gymnastics Championships